When the Whistle Blows is an American comedy television series that aired for 10 hour-long episodes on ABC from March 14 to July 20, 1980. The series was produced by Universal Television and starred Dolph Sweet, Doug Barr, Susan Buckner, Philip Brown and Tim Rossovich. It was filmed single-camera style and without a laugh track.

Summary
The series revolved around a group of construction workers – four males (Norm, Buzz, Randy and Hunk) and one female (Lucy) – for the "Tri-State Construction Company" in Los Angeles and their search for fun both on and off the job. After hours, the gang's favorite hangout is a saloon called "Darlene's", run by Darlene Ridgeway.

Cast
 Dolph Sweet as Norm Jenkins
 Doug Barr as Buzz Dillard
 Susan Buckner as Lucy Davis
 Philip Brown as Randy Hartford
 Tim Rossovich as Martin "Hunk" Kincaid
 Sue Ane Langdon as Darlene Ridgeway

Episodes

References

External links
 

1980 American television series debuts
1980 American television series endings
1980s American sitcoms
American Broadcasting Company original programming
English-language television shows
Television shows set in Los Angeles
Television series by Universal Television